Xavier "Xavi" Gurri López (born 18 April 1970) is a Spanish retired footballer who played as a defender, and the current assistant manager of Indian club Hyderabad FC.

Playing career
Born in Montornès del Vallès, Barcelona, Catalonia, Gurri never player in any higher than Segunda División B during his entire career, representing mainly EC Granollers and Girona FC. He retired in 2000 with Granollers.

Coaching career
After retiring, Gurri took up coaching, working at RCD Espanyol and Granollers' youth setups. His first senior experience came with UE Canovelles in 2005, and he subsequently managed UDA Gramenet's reserves, CF Mollet, and CE Sant Celoni before returning to youth football with UE Cornellà.

Gurri then worked for former sides Canovelles, Granollers, Gramenet and Mollet before moving abroad in 2014, joining Javier Aguirre's staff at Al Wahda FC. In 2018, he also had a brief stint coaching the under-17 squad of Finnish side FC Honka before reuniting with Aguirre in the Egypt national team.

In 2019, Gurri returned to Honka's under-17s, but left in the end of the year to work as an assistant manager of Indian Super League side Hyderabad FC. In January 2020, he was named interim manager of the latter club after the sacking of Phil Brown.

Ahead of the 2020–21 campaign, Gurri was named Albert Roca's assistant.

References

External links

1970 births
Living people
Footballers from Granollers
Spanish footballers
Association football defenders
Segunda División B players
Tercera División players
Girona FC players
Spanish football managers
Indian Super League head coaches
Spanish expatriate football managers
Expatriate football managers in Finland
Expatriate football managers in India
Hyderabad FC managers